The 2019 World Sprint Speed Skating Championships was held at the Thialf in Heerenveen, Netherlands, from 23 to 24 February 2019.

Schedule
All times are local (UTC+1).

Medal summary

Medal table

Medalists

References

 
World Sprint Speed Skating
World Sprint Championships
2019 Sprint Speed Skating Championships
World Sprint Speed Skating
World Sprint Speed Skating Championships, 2019
2019 Sprint